is a Japanese boxer. He competed in the men's light welterweight event at the 1972 Summer Olympics.

References

1949 births
Living people
Japanese male boxers
Olympic boxers of Japan
Boxers at the 1972 Summer Olympics
Place of birth missing (living people)
Light-welterweight boxers
20th-century Japanese people